Nokia 5700 XpressMusic is a smartphone by Nokia, announced on March 29, 2007, as the successor to the Nokia 3250, but also looks very similar to Nokia 5300. It is a Symbian S60 3rd Edition FP1 smartphone that was sold under the XpressMusic sub-brand, which emphasises music and multimedia playback. The Nokia 5700 XpressMusic is a monoblock twistable phone which weighs 115 g. It has a casing made of glossy white plastic, and a black or red mat plastic middle section. There is a rubber flap on the right hand side which covers a microSD hotswap card slot, USB port and charging jack.

Twist keypad 
The phone's keypad was designed to be twisted to four different positions, each allowing easier access to a specific function of the phone:
Keypad facing forward The main mode of the Nokia 5700 XpressMusic. In this position the keypad works like the one on any other phone.
Playback controls facing forward Twisting the keypad around to this position automatically activates the music player.
Camera facing away This position automatically starts the camera application to take pictures or create videos. If the phone's video player application is being used, twisting to this position automatically changes the video to horizontal full screen mode, and it is possible to stand the 5700 on its side in this position so it is easier to watch videos.
Camera facing forward This position automatically starts the camera application and is intended for self-portraits and for videophone calls. This position lets the phone be laid down horizontally on its side for hands-free use of the video camera.

References

External links 
 Nokia 5700 XpressMusic at Nokia Europe
 Nokia 5700 XpressMusic at Nokia Forum

5510
Mobile phones introduced in 2007
Mobile phones with infrared transmitter